The 2019–20 Southern Miss Golden Eagles men's basketball team represents the University of Southern Mississippi during the 2019–20 NCAA Division I men's basketball season. The Golden Eagles, led by first-year head coach Jay Ladner, play their home games at Reed Green Coliseum in Hattiesburg, Mississippi as members of Conference USA.

Previous season
The Golden Eagles finished the 2018–19 season 20–13, 11–7 in C-USA play to finish in a tie for third place. They defeated Marshall in the quarterfinals before losing to Western Kentucky in the semifinals of the C-USA tournament. They were invited to the College Basketball Invitational where they lost to Longwood in the first round.

Doc Sadler resigned on April 11 after 5 seasons at Southern Miss. Under Sadler, the Golden Eagles went 56–94 overall, but this season was their best under Sadler, in which the team went 20–13 overall and finished tied for 2nd in conference play. The following day, new Nebraska head coach Fred Hoiberg announced he had hired Sadler, a former Cornhuskers head coach who had spent a season on Hoiberg's staff at Iowa State, as an assistant. The school hired Southeastern Louisiana head coach and fellow alumnus Jay Ladner as their new head coach on April 17.

Departures

Incoming Transfers

Recruiting class of 2019

Roster

Schedule and results

|-
!colspan=9 style=|Exhibition

|-
!colspan=9 style=|Non-conference regular season

|-
!colspan=12 style=| Conference USA regular season

References

Southern Miss Golden Eagles basketball seasons
Southern Miss
Southern Miss
Southern Miss